The letters CMQ may represent any of the following:

Media 
 CMQ have been used as call letters for the following broadcasting stations in Havana, Cuba:
 the pre-1959 CMQ radio and television network
 Radio stations CMQ (AM) and CMQ-FM: currently Radio Rebelde
 Television station CMQ-TV channel 6: currently Cubavision International
 The trade publication Canadian Metallurgical Quarterly; see Canadian Institute of Mining, Metallurgy and Petroleum
 The publication Church Music Quarterly, the magazine of the Royal School of Church Music (RSCM)

Transport 
 The IATA airport code for Clermont Airport in Clermont, Queensland, Australia
 Club Mitsubishi Québec (Quebec Mitsubishi auto Club)
 Reporting mark of the Central Maine and Quebec Railway

Other 
 Communauté métropolitaine de Québec (Quebec Metropolitan Community)
 Collège des médecins du Québec (Quebec College of Physicians)
 The Australian Securities Exchange code for Chemeq
 CMQ is The Common-Metric-Questionnaire (CMQ)
 CMQ is also an acronym meaning cutting myself quietly
 CMQ  Certified Manager of Quality
 CMQ also refers to the Conspiracy Mentality Questionnaire.
 CMQ is a nickname of author Casey McQuiston